The following is a partial list of the "C" codes for Medical Subject Headings (MeSH), as defined by the United States National Library of Medicine (NLM).

This list continues the information at List of MeSH codes (C06). Codes following these are found at List of MeSH codes (C08). For other MeSH codes, see List of MeSH codes.

The source for this content is the set of 2006 MeSH Trees from the NLM.

– stomatognathic diseases

– jaw diseases

– cherubism

– granuloma, giant cell

– jaw abnormalities
  – cleft palate
  – micrognathism
  – Pierre Robin syndrome
  – prognathism
  – retrognathism

– jaw cysts
  – nonodontogenic cysts
  – odontogenic cysts
  – basal cell nevus syndrome
  – dentigerous cyst
  – odontogenic cyst, calcifying
  – periodontal cyst
  – radicular cyst

– jaw, edentulous
  – jaw, edentulous, partially

– jaw neoplasms
  – mandibular neoplasms
  – maxillary neoplasms
  – palatal neoplasms

– mandibular diseases
  – craniomandibular disorders
  – temporomandibular joint disorders
  – temporomandibular joint dysfunction syndrome
  – mandibular neoplasms
  – prognathism
  – retrognathism

– maxillary diseases
  – maxillary neoplasms

– mouth diseases

– Behçet syndrome

– Bell's palsy

– burning mouth syndrome

– candidiasis, oral

– dry socket

– facial hemiatrophy

– facial neuralgia

– facial paralysis

– focal epithelial hyperplasia

– hemifacial spasm

– leukoedema, oral

– lichen planus, oral

– lip diseases
  – cheilitis
  – cleft lip
  – herpes labialis
  – lip neoplasms

– Ludwig's angina

– Melkersson–Rosenthal syndrome

– mouth abnormalities
  – cleft lip
  – cleft palate
  – fibromatosis, gingival
  – macrostomia
  – microstomia
  – velopharyngeal insufficiency

– mouth, edentulous
  – jaw, edentulous
  – jaw, edentulous, partially

– mouth neoplasms
  – gingival neoplasms
  – leukoplakia, oral
  – leukoplakia, hairy
  – lip neoplasms
  – palatal neoplasms
  – salivary gland neoplasms
  – parotid neoplasms
  – sublingual gland neoplasms
  – submandibular gland neoplasms
  – tongue neoplasms

– mucositis

– noma

– oral fistula
  – dental fistula
  – oroantral fistula
  – salivary gland fistula

– oral hemorrhage
  – gingival hemorrhage

– oral manifestations

– oral submucous fibrosis

– oral ulcer

– periapical diseases
  – periapical periodontitis
  – periapical abscess
  – periapical granuloma
  – radicular cyst

– periodontal diseases
  – alveolar bone loss
  – furcation defects
  – gingival diseases
  – gingival hemorrhage
  – gingival neoplasms
  – gingival overgrowth
  – fibromatosis, gingival
  – gingival hyperplasia
  – gingival hypertrophy
  – gingival recession
  – gingivitis
  – gingival pocket
  – gingivitis, necrotizing ulcerative
  – granuloma, giant cell
  – pericoronitis
  – periodontal attachment loss
  – periodontal cyst
  – periodontitis
  – periodontal abscess
  – periodontal pocket
  – periodontitis, juvenile
  – tooth loss
  – tooth migration
  – mesial movement of teeth
  – tooth mobility

– ranula

– salivary gland diseases
  – Mikulicz' disease
  – parotid diseases
  – parotid neoplasms
  – parotitis
  – mumps
  – salivary duct calculi
  – salivary gland calculi
  – salivary gland fistula
  – salivary gland neoplasms
  – parotid neoplasms
  – sublingual gland neoplasms
  – submandibular gland neoplasms
  – sialadenitis
  – parotitis
  – sialometaplasia, necrotizing
  – sialorrhea
  – submandibular gland diseases
  – submandibular gland neoplasms
  – xerostomia
  – Sjögren syndrome

– stomatitis
  – Stevens–Johnson syndrome
  – stomatitis, aphthous
  – stomatitis, denture
  – stomatitis, herpetic

– tongue diseases
  – glossalgia
  – glossitis
  – glossitis, benign migratory
  – macroglossia
  – tongue, fissured
  – tongue, hairy
  – tongue neoplasms

– tuberculosis, oral

– pharyngeal diseases

– nasopharyngeal diseases
  – nasopharyngeal neoplasms
  – nasopharyngitis

– peritonsillar abscess

– pharyngeal neoplasms
  – hypopharyngeal neoplasms
  – nasopharyngeal neoplasms
  – oropharyngeal neoplasms
  – tonsillar neoplasms

– pharyngitis

– retropharyngeal abscess

– tonsillitis

– velopharyngeal insufficiency

– stomatognathic system abnormalities

– maxillofacial abnormalities
  – jaw abnormalities
  – cleft palate
  – micrognathism
  – Pierre Robin syndrome
  – prognathism
  – retrognathism

– mouth abnormalities
  – cleft lip
  – cleft palate
  – fibromatosis, gingival
  – macrostomia
  – microstomia
  – velopharyngeal insufficiency

– tooth abnormalities
  – amelogenesis imperfecta
  – dental enamel hypoplasia
  – anodontia
  – dens in dente
  – dentin dysplasia
  – dentinogenesis imperfecta
  – fused teeth
  – odontodysplasia
  – tooth, supernumerary

– temporomandibular joint disorders

– temporomandibular joint dysfunction syndrome

– tooth diseases

– bruxism
  – sleep bruxism

– dental deposits
  – dental calculus
  – dental plaque

– dental leakage

– dental pulp diseases
  – dental pulp calcification
  – dental pulp exposure
  – dental pulp necrosis
  – dentin, secondary
  – pulpitis
  – tooth, nonvital

– dentin sensitivity

– fluorosis, dental

– focal infection, dental

– hypercementosis

– malocclusion
  – dental occlusion, traumatic
  – diastema
  – malocclusion, angle class i
  – malocclusion, angle class ii
  – malocclusion, angle class iii
  – open bite

– tooth abnormalities
  – amelogenesis imperfecta
  – dental enamel hypoplasia
  – anodontia
  – dens in dente
  – dentin dysplasia
  – dentinogenesis imperfecta
  – fused teeth
  – odontodysplasia
  – tooth, supernumerary

– tooth abrasion

– tooth ankylosis

– tooth attrition

– tooth demineralization
  – dental caries
  – dental fissures
  – root caries

– tooth discoloration

– tooth erosion

– tooth eruption, ectopic

– tooth, impacted

– tooth injuries
  – tooth avulsion
  – tooth fractures
  – cracked tooth syndrome

– tooth loss

– tooth resorption
  – root resorption

– tooth, unerupted

– toothache

The list continues at List of MeSH codes (C08).

C07